Tima is a city in the Sohag Governorate of Upper Egypt. It is located on the west bank of the Nile.

See also

 List of cities and towns in Egypt

References

Populated places in Sohag Governorate
Cities in Egypt